Yousif Habib Bu Arish (born 25 November 2000) is a Kuwaiti-born Saudi Arabian swimmer. He competed in the 2020 Summer Olympics.

References

External links

2000 births
Living people
Swimmers at the 2020 Summer Olympics
Saudi Arabian male swimmers
Olympic swimmers of Saudi Arabia
Swimmers at the 2018 Summer Youth Olympics
Swimmers at the 2018 Asian Games
Asian Games competitors for Saudi Arabia